Jan Thomas Valentin Wallentin (born 8 April 1970 in Linköping, Sweden) is a Swedish journalist and writer.

Jan Wallentin has worked as a news journalist for Sveriges Television. He made his debut as a novelist in October 2010 with the book Strindberg's Star, noted for having been sold to 16 countries before it had even been published in Swedish. In the fall of 2019, he came out with the weightless Jesper Fock, a novel about the depression epidemic, the climate disaster and the meaning of life.

Bibliography
Strindbergs stjärna (Strindberg's Star), Bonniers 2010,

References

External links
Interview in Sveriges Radio P1, 28 October 2010 

1970 births
Living people
Swedish writers
Swedish journalists
Writers from Östergötland